Nina Karlsson (born 16 November 1975) is a retired Swedish professional golfer. She won the Swedish Golf Tour (SGT) Order of Merit in 1997 and 1998, and played on the Ladies European Tour (LET) ten seasons 1998–2007.

Amateur career
Karlsson won the 1993 Norwegian Ladies Open Amateur Championship and represented Sweden at the 1994 European Girls' Team Championship at Club de Campo in Malaga, Spain, where her team finished fifth.

Professional career
Karlsson turned professional in 1995 and joined the Swedish Golf Tour (SGT) where she recorded five career wins, including winning the Körunda Ladies Open twice. She reached the final in SM Match three years running 1995–1997 but lost to Mia Löjdahl, Anna Berg and Catrin Nilsmark, respectively. After winning the SGT Order of Merit in 1997 and 1998, she joined the Ladies European Tour in 1998.

On the LET, Karlsson finished top-50 on the Order of Merit in 1999, 2000, 2002 and 2003. Her top finishes include T6 at the 1999 Donegal Irish Ladies' Open, two strokes behind Sandrine Mendiburu, T7 at the 2000 Ladies Hannover Expo 2000 Open, and T5 at the Ladies Open de Costa Azul and T10 at the P4 Norwegian Masters in 2002. She made the cut at the 2000 Women's British Open but missed the cut in 2002 and 2004.

Karlsson retired after the 2007 season due to a back injury.

LET scoring record
Karlsson carded a 29 for nine holes in the final round of the 2005 Ladies Central European Open at Old Lake GC in Hungary (par 71), tying the LET 9-hole record for lowest round set by Kitrina Douglas at the 1988 Ladies Italian Open and later matched by Laura Davies, Trish Johnson and Sophie Gustafson.

Amateur wins
1993 Norwegian Ladies Open Amateur Championship

Source:

Professional wins (7)

Swedish Golf Tour wins (5)

Source:

Other wins (2)
1997 Swedish Mother-Daughter Championship (with Margareth Karlsson)
1998 Swedish Mother-Daughter Championship (with Margareth Karlsson)

Source:

Results in LPGA majors

Note: Karlsson only played in the Women's British Open.

CUT = missed the half-way cut

Team appearances
Amateur
European Girls' Team Championship (representing Sweden): 1993

See also
Ladies European Tour records

References

External links

Swedish female golfers
Ladies European Tour golfers
Sportspeople from Kronoberg County
People from Växjö
1975 births
Living people